Eois lavinia is a moth in the  family Geometridae. It is found in Costa Rica: its type locality is Turrialba.

References

Moths described in 1912
Taxa named by William Schaus
Eois
Moths of Central America